Siah Khan was an 8 ft 6 in (259 cm) tall Persian man.

Siah Khan may also refer to:
 Siah Khan (30°57′ N 61°35′ E), Hirmand
 Siah Khan (31°08′ N 61°47′ E), Hirmand